The Cabinet of Botswana consists of the President, Vice President and all the Ministers and assistant ministers, the permanent secretary and deputy permanent secretary to the president and cabinet.

Current cabinet
Following the Botswana Democratic Party's victory in the 2019 general election, President Mokgweetsi Masisi announced the formation of his second cabinet on 6 November 2019. The cabinet was reformed in 2022 in what the government described as a rationalisation of responsibilities.

<noinclude>

See also
 Politics of Botswana

References

Botswana
Politics of Botswana